The Canadian soccer league system, also called the Canadian soccer pyramid, is a term used in soccer to describe the structure of the league system in Canada. The governing body of soccer in the country is the Canadian Soccer Association (CSA), which oversees the system and domestic cups (including the Canadian Championship) but does not operate any of its component leagues. In addition, some Canadian teams compete in leagues that are based in the United States.

Men

League structure
The Canadian soccer system consists of several unconnected leagues and it does not have promotion and relegation. Leagues in the Canadian system are classified as either professional, pro-am, or amateur. The Canadian Soccer Association (CSA) is the governing body for the sport in Canada and directly sanctions leagues that operate in more than one province. Leagues operating in a single province receive sanctioning from their provincial soccer association.

Professional (division 1) 
The Canadian Premier League (CPL) is the top division of soccer in Canada. It is the only fully professional, and only fully national league in the system. Founded in 2019, the CPL is composed of eight teams and is sanctioned by the CSA. 

There are also three Canadian teams which play in Major League Soccer, the division 1 league sanctioned by the United States Soccer Federation, reflecting a longstanding practice of major Canadian sports franchises competing in American leagues. The Canadian clubs in this league are members of the CSA and compete in the Canadian Championship, rather than in the U.S. Open Cup, alongside clubs from the CPL and qualified lower division clubs. 

The three Canadian MLS clubs also compete in the Leagues Cup, a competition held between MLS and Liga MX division one clubs, as the North American regional competition within CONCACAF. The CPL does not take part in this competition.

Pro-am (division 3) 
Pro-am (or semi-pro) soccer competitions in Canada are regionally-based due to its large geography and dispersed pockets of population. Teams playing in pro-am leagues are permitted to be composed of professional and amateur players. There are three of such leagues in Canada: League1 Ontario (L1O); the Première ligue de soccer du Québec (PLSQ); and League1 British Columbia (L1BC). They are based in the provinces of Ontario, Quebec and British Columbia, respectively, and are sanctioned by their relevant provincial soccer associations. There are 42 sanctioned teams playing in these leagues. These three leagues belong to the parent organization League1 Canada which was founded in 2022.

The PLSQ was founded as a semi-pro league in 2012 and is sanctioned by Soccer Quebec. The league includes a team from Eastern Ontario, who compete with special permission from the CSA.

Following the release of "The Easton Report" in 2013, the CSA set out to create a Division 3 semi-pro structure divided by region, similar to the major junior hockey leagues in Canada, with regional champions competing in a national tournament. In November 2013, the Ontario Soccer Association announced the sanction of League1 Ontario as part of this new structure.

On October 5, 2021, BC Soccer announced the establishment of League1 British Columbia as the nation's third regional pro-am soccer league. The league began play in May 2022 with seven clubs.

In 2022, Toronto FC II and Whitecaps FC 2 began play in MLS Next Pro, a USSF-sanctioned division 3 league. Both Canadian clubs are members of the CSA. Toronto FC II had played in the division 2 USL Championship until 2018 and in the division 3 USL League One from 2019 to 2021.

Amateur 
There are various amateur provincial leagues that are sanctioned under their individual provincial or territorial associations. This includes such leagues as the Pacific Coast Soccer League, Vancouver Island Soccer League, Vancouver Metro Soccer League, Fraser Valley Soccer League, Alberta Major Soccer League, Saskatchewan Premier Soccer League, Manitoba Major Soccer League, Ontario Soccer League, Ligue de Soccer Elite Quebec, Nova Scotia Soccer League, and New Brunswick Premier Senior Soccer League. This collection of leagues across the country collectively compete for the Challenge Trophy.

There are 13 provincial and territorial soccer associations in Canada, with a number of leagues organized as amateur competitions at adult and/or youth levels. Typically there is promotion and relegation plus league and cup competitions in each provincial and territorial association, which culminates in the national Challenge Trophy. However, not all associations consistently send representative teams to national championships.

The United Soccer League (USL) manages several leagues, including the amateur USL League Two (USL2). USL2 is sanctioned and administered under the USASA and is below Division 3 in the United States soccer league system. On November 18, 2015, four Ontario teams (including FC London, who then moved to L1O) were given notice by the Ontario Soccer Association that they would no longer be permitted to participate in the league starting in 2017.

Pyramid breakdown

National cups
The Canadian Championship is the primary domestic cup in Canada. It was established in 2008 to determine the nation's representative at the CONCACAF Champions League. The tournament is organized by the Canadian Soccer Association and is open to fully professional Canadian teams (playing in American or Canadian leagues) and the winners of the Canadian regional pro-am leagues. The winner of the Canadian Championship is awarded the fan-created Voyageurs Cup which predates the tournament.

The Challenge Trophy is Canada's national men's amateur championship. It has been contested since 1913.

Professional leagues background
By the mid-1960s, there were four major leagues across Canada including the Eastern Canada Professional Soccer League (1961–1967). From west to east, the other major leagues were the Pacific Coast Soccer League (British Columbia), the Western Canada Soccer League (Alberta, Saskatchewan and eventually Manitoba and British Columbia), and the National Soccer League (Ontario and Quebec). In 1968, Canadian soccer turned its attention to the cross-nation North American Soccer League that initially featured professional teams in Vancouver and Toronto. Over the next 15 years, the professional league also featured teams in Calgary, Edmonton, and Montreal.

After the collapse of the original North American Soccer League, and Canada's participation in the 1986 FIFA World Cup the original Canadian Soccer League started operations as a nationally based CSA sanctioned Division 1 league. When the original CSL folded in 1993, three Canadian teams moved to the American Professional Soccer League (APSL) where several had played preseason games and competed in post season tournaments. Later in 1993, Major League Soccer (MLS) beat the APSL and won the USSF's competition for U.S. Division 1 status. Canadian teams continued to participate in the APSL and subsequently with the United Soccer Leagues merger in the A League / USL-1. FIFA did not allow the U.S. Division 1 sanctioned league to include foreign teams which was why the APSL was never officially recognized as Division 1 before MLS.

MLS would eventually expand into Canadian cities with existing U.S. Division 2 teams. Newly created Toronto FC joined MLS for the 2007 season, whereas the existing Toronto Lynx self relegated from the USL-1 and began playing in the amateur-only USL Premier Development League. The owners of Vancouver Whitecaps FC of the USSF Division 2 Professional League formed a team that joined MLS in 2011, and the owners Montreal Impact of the North American Soccer League created a team that joined in 2012.

One of the other original CSL teams did not join the APSL, they joined the National Soccer League based in southern Ontario. The National Soccer League renamed itself the Canadian National Soccer League (CNSL) with the addition of an out of province team. The CNSL had four teams found the second league named the Canadian Professional Soccer League (1998–2006) or CPSL with four other new teams. In 2006, the CPSL teams restarted in a new league, the second Canadian Soccer League (CSL). This second version of the CSL was initially sanctioned the Ontario Soccer Association and later by the Canadian Soccer Association as Division 3 in 2009. Following a match fixing scandal the league was then de-sanctioned in 2014 and continues to operate as a member of the Soccer Federation of Canada (SFC) that is not associated with any international body.

In February 2010, the Canadian Soccer League was granted full membership by the CSA and sanctioned as a semi-professional league. Sitting behind MLS and the NASL, the CSL operated as one of the Division 3 leagues within the Canadian pyramid. However, following the release of a development study and subsequent change in CSA policy for the future growth and development of regional leagues, also coinciding with match fixing allegations in 2012, the CSL was de-sanctioned by the CSA in 2013 and would not be considered a CSA sanctioned semi-pro league for the 2014 season.

In order to limit the Americanization of all of Canada's professional soccer clubs, the CSA issued a moratorium on the sanctioning of any new Division 2, 3, or 4 teams on November 15, 2010, which lasted until September 30, 2011. Despite the moratorium, the NASL announced that Ottawa had been awarded a franchise on June 20, 2011.

Women

Professional

There are no professional women's soccer teams in Canada. The CSA formerly had an affiliation with the U.S.-based National Women's Soccer League where some Canada women's national soccer team would be assigned to an NWSL club. This affiliation ended in 2021 although many Canadians continue to play in the American league. In 2022, former national team player Diana Matheson and current national team captain Christine Sinclair announced a new Canadian women's professional league targetted to start play in 2025. Matheson and Project 8 Sports Inc. are leading this effort while Sinclair is involved in an advisory role. In their announcement, they confirmed that Vancouver Whitecaps FC and Calgary Foothills WFC would be two of the league's inaugural teams.

Pro-am

Various women's leagues operate throughout Canada and the United States at a lower level than NWSL in a pro-am setup. As with the men's system, there is often no formal relationship (or results-based promotion/relegation) between leagues. Three are three Canadian leagues (CSA Division 3): League1 Ontario, Première ligue de soccer du Québec and League1 British Columbia, which have a total of 39-CSA sanctioned clubs. Like the men's divisions of these leagues, League1 Canada was formed to provide an umbrella organization for the three leagues. Starting in 2022, League1 Canada will sponsor a Division 3 Inter-provincial championship. The annual competition will include the three Division 3 champions and a second club from the league designated to host the competition. There are also two Canadian clubs, both based in Alberta, competing in the United Women's Soccer League 1 (USSF Division 2).

U Sports and amateur

U Sports women's soccer is a league competition for students at Canadian universities. The two-month season is followed by the U Sports women's soccer championship to determine a national champion.

There are provincial competitions run by each of the provincial soccer associations to qualify an amateur team for the national championship, the Jubilee Trophy. Some of these are leagues and others cup competitions. Many other primarily adult amateur leagues, some with eight month seasons, also culminate in the Jubilee Trophy. There are indoor (March) and outdoor (September) national championships given Canada's climate.

Pyramid breakdown

See also
 Soccer in Canada
 List of Canadian soccer clubs in American leagues
 United States soccer league system

References

Football league systems in North America